Philip Edwards (3 September 1949 – 24 April 2017) was a British professional road racing cyclist.

Cycling career
He represented the United Kingdom at the 1972 Summer Olympics in Munich, West Germany, where he finished sixth in the road race, just behind teammate Phil Bayton.

He represented England in the road race, at the 1974 British Commonwealth Games in Christchurch, New Zealand before becoming a professional cyclist from 1976 to 1980.

It was reported that he died of a suspected heart attack at his home in Monaco on Monday, 24 April  2017 aged 67.

Major results
1967
 1st  Road race, National Junior Road Championships
1972
 1st Lincoln Grand Prix
 6th Road race, Olympic Games
 9th Overall Trophée Peugeot de l'Avenir
1974
 1st  Overall Giro del Friuli Venezia Giulia
1977
 1st  Road race, National Road Championships
 2nd Tre Valli Varesine
 3rd Giro dell'Emilia
 3rd Trofeo Matteotti
 6th Coppa Ugo Agostoni
1978
 1st Stage 7a Volta a Catalunya
 5th Coppa Bernocchi
 7th Paris–Tours
1979 
 2nd Gran Premio Città di Camaiore

Grand Tour general classification results timeline

References

External links
 
 Biographical details, Yeovil Cycling Club Newsletter Jan 2007 "The Pedaller"

1949 births
2017 deaths
English male cyclists
Cyclists at the 1972 Summer Olympics
Cyclists at the 1974 British Commonwealth Games
Olympic cyclists of Great Britain
British cycling road race champions
Sportspeople from Bristol
Commonwealth Games competitors for England